Tarun Kumar Chatterjee  (24 February 1931 – 27 October 2003) was an Indian actor who is known for his exclusive work in Bengali cinema. In most of his films, his role as a supporting actor gave him huge appreciation from critics and audience.

Personal life
Tarun Kumar was born on 24 February 1931 in Kolkata. He was the youngest brother of actor Uttam Kumar. Tarun Kumar passed his Matriculation from South Suburban School. Although he joined Ashutosh College, he could not continue his studies. In his professional life, he used to work in Maclyod Company, Metro Cinema and then at Burn Company for few days. In 1962, he married fellow actress Subrata Chattopadhyay ( 1940 - 2004 )  and had a daughter. Tarun Kumar was also known by his nick name 'Buro' among film industry people. His grandson Sourav Banerjee is also an actor.

Career 
Kumar acted in over 500 films since making his debut with Hrod in 1954. In Jhinder Bandi, he played the rival, Udit, the brother of Shankar played by Uttam Kumar. In Se Chupi Chupi Aase and Sonar Harin, he played the antagonist. However, in most Uttam Kumar starred films, he either played the role of a friend in Saptapadi, Chhadmabesi, Jeeban Mrityu, Deya Neya to name a few or that of an associate or well-wisher in films like Raja Saja, Dhanyi Meye, Mon Niye, Sanyasi Raja, Kayahiner Kahini  and Brajabuli. Tarun Kumar's acting skill may well be underrated by the tall shadow of his elder brother, Uttam Kumar but probably he was one of the finest character actors ever worked in Bengali film industry, who performed with equal ease in all types of roles irrespective of comic (e.g. Haat Baralei Bandhu, Basanta Bilaap, Mouchak and Personal Assistant), negative (e.g. Joradighir Choudhuri Paribaar, Dui Purush and Kalankita Nayak) and intense (e.g. Sonar Khancha and Stree etc.) characters, including cameo (e.g. Sesh Anka and Rajkanya). He received the President's award for his performance in the film Dadathakur in 1966. Apart from films he acted on quite a few professional theatres. His play Nahabat, in which he had one of the main roles, ran for about seven years.

Other works
He was chiefly instrumental to establish the Uttam Mancha, an auditorium in South Kolkata, named after his elder brother, the iconic Uttam Kumar whom he loved and adored. Presently, this hall is under the supervision of the Kolkata Municipal Corporation.

Death 
Tarun Kumar died on 27 October 2003 at the age of 72.

Selected filmography

  Punarmilan 
  Dadathakur 
 Saptapadi
  Chupi Chupi Aashey
  Sonar Harin
  Haat Baralei Bandhu 
  Jhinder Bandi 
  Kuhak
  Raja Saja 
  Deya Neya 
  Sesh Anka 
 Paka Dekha
  Personal Assistant
 Hrad
  Dui Bhai 
  Bhrantibilas 
 Rajkanya
  Kaal Tumi Aaleya 
  Jiban Mrityu 
  Ashite Ashiona 
  Mon Niye 
 Kalankita Nayak
  Chhadmabesi 
  Chowranghee 
  Joradighir Choudhuri Paribaar 
  Dhanyee Meye (also known as Dhanyi Meye)
 Rajkumari
  Jay Jayanti 
  Basanta Bilap 
 Dui Purush
 Stree
  Sonar Khancha 
  Mouchak 
 Sanyasi Raja
  Kayahiner Kahini 
  Phuleswari 
  Chameli Memsaheb 
 Striker
  Brajabuli 
  Binimoi 
  Bahnisikha 
  Sonay Sohaga 
  Behula Lakhindar 
  Pampa
  Tasher Ghar
   Abak Prithibi
  Sathi Hara
  Surya Sikha
  Shudhu Ekti Bachhar  Kal Tumi Aleya  Chhoti Si Mulaqat
  Antony Firingee
  Kamallata  Chhadmabeshi
  Roudra Chhaya
  Chander Kachhakaachhi
  Shesh Anka
  Agnishwar
  Andha Atit
  Aparichito  Asadharan  Anandamela  Ami Se O Sakha  Alor Thikana  Indrani
  Ekhane Pinjar
  Garh Nasimpur
  Jiban Trishna
  Dhanraj Tamang
  Natun Tirtha
  Nidhiram Sardar
  Prithibi Amare Chay
  Banhisikha
  Bagh Bondi Khela
  Kancher Swarga''

References 

Bengali male actors
2003 deaths
1931 births